The Missouri Community College Athletic Conference (MCCAC) is a college athletic conference affiliated with the National Junior College Athletic Association (NJCAA) within its Region 16. The MCCAC is headquartered in St. Louis, Missouri.

Member schools

Current members
The MCCAC currently has nine full members, all but one are public schools:

Notes

Former members
The MCCAC had five full members, both were public schools:

Notes

External links
 MCCAC Website
 NJCAA Region 16 website
 NJCAA Website

NJCAA conferences
College sports in Missouri
1965 establishments in Missouri